Thomas Heberer (born 13 November 1947 in Offenbach/Main, Germany) is a Senior Professor of Chinese Politics & Society at the University Duisburg-Essen, Germany.

Education
Thomas Heberer studied Social Anthropology (major), Philosophy, Political Science, and Chinese Studies in Frankfurt, Göttingen, Mainz and Heidelberg.

In 1977, Heberer completed his Ph.D. at the University of Bremen on the Mass Line concept of the Chinese Communist Party. The same year he went to China, where he worked as a translator and reader for the Foreign Languages Press in Beijing for more than four years (1977–81). In this way, he became a contemporary witness of China's early reform and transformation process.

Career 
Thomas Heberer worked from 1983 to 1985 as a research fellow with the Overseas Museum in Bremen (Übersee-Museum Bremen), where he was put in charge of the Chinese Collection and established the museum's permanent China exhibit. He was then appointed as a research fellow at the Institute of Geography of the University of Bremen and carried out a research project, funded by the Volkswagen Foundation, on the development of the private economic sector in China. This project was followed by his habilitation (post-doctoral degree) thesis on the role of the individual (“informal”) economic sector of urban and social development in China. In 1989 he received the venia legendi, or authorization to lecture, in Political Science at the University of Bremen.

From 1991 to 1992, Heberer served as a professor of Chinese Economic Studies at the University for Applied Sciences in Bremen. From 1992 to 1998, he acted as a professor of political science with a focus on East Asian politics at the University of Trier. From 1998 to 2013, he has held a chair professorship of political science with a focus on East Asia at the University of Duisburg-Essen’s Institute of East Asian Studies. Upon his retirement in February 2013 he was appointed a Senior Professor of Chinese Politics and Society by the university president. Since then, he is still actively involved in conducting basic research on China and its political and social development.

Heberer has held visiting professor roles at: Seoul National University, University of Washington; China Center for Comparative Politics and Economics; National Taiwan University and National Sun Yat-sen University; Zhejiang University; University of Vienna and Peking University.

Research
Heberer conducted his first field research in 1981 on the issue of Chinese nationalities’ policies and development policies in ethnic minority areas among the Yi (Nuosu), one of the largest ethnic minorities in China, in the Liangshan Mountains in Southwestern Sichuan province. Since then he has continuously worked on various aspects of the Yi society such as ethnic entrepreneur and environmental governance, and has been actively involved in creating academic and public awareness for the Yi minority. In 1998 he hosted the “Second International Yi Conference” at the University of Trier, and in 2006 he organized a major exhibition on the history, culture, religion, and society of the Yi at the Duisburg Historical Museum. In 2000/2001 he collected 250,000 Deutsche Mark among several German institutions for establishing a primary school for Yi minority children in Meigu County including a scholarship program.

Throughout the following decades, Heberer continued his field research, extending it into the areas of behavior of social actors and institutional change and investigating such diverse topics as the development of China's private sector, rural urbanization and social change, the political and social role of private entrepreneurs in China and Vietnam, the diffusion of intellectual ideas into politics, environmental governance, urban communities (shequ), mobilized participation and co-production; administrative reforms; new patterns of governance in rural areas; and the agency of local cadres.

Heberer has also studied the formal and informal political participation and organizational behavior of social groups in China. In the process, he has further developed the sociological concept of “strategic groups” in the context of both local cadres and entrepreneurial groups in China. In addition, he studied social and policy innovations in China, and with critical junctures of authoritarian systems. He also worked on new patterns of political representation and new political representative claims from a comparative perspective, and on social disciplining and civilizing processes in the context of modernization.

Thomas Heberer is also on the editorial board of several academic journals, including the International Journal of Political Science & Diplomacy, The China Quarterly (until the end of 2021), the Journal of China in Comparative Perspective, the European Journal of East Asian Studies, the Journal of Current Chinese Affairs, the Journal of Chinese Governance, the Chinese Political Science Review, the International Quarterly for Asian Studies, the International Journal of Political Science & Diplomacy, and the journal 国外理论动态/Foreign Theoretical Trends. He is co-founder of the “Association of Social Science Research on China” (ASC) and was on the advisory board of the Europe-China Academic Network (ECAN) of the European Commission.

Furthermore, Heberer is active as a political consultant. Among other things, he has worked in this context on the issue of urban diplomacy.

Selected publications 
Heberer has authored or co-authored more than 40 books and has also edited or co-edited more than 25 volumes in German, English and Chinese. His English publications include: 
 Private Entrepreneurs in China and Vietnam. Social and Political Functioning of Strategic Groups. China Studies published for the Institute for Chinese Studies, University of Oxford, Leiden (Brill) 2003;
 (co-edited by Claudia Derichs), The Power of Ideas – Intellectual Input and Political Change in East and Southeast Asia, Copenhagen 2006 (NIAS Press);
 (co-authored by Fan Jie and Wolfgang Taubmann), Rural China: Economic and Social Change in the Late Twentieth Century, Armonk/London (M.E. Sharpe) 2006; [Reprint Routledge, 2015]
 Doing Business in Rural China: Liangshan's New Ethnic Entrepreneurs, Seattle/London (University of Washington Press) 2007;
 (co-edited by Gunter Schubert), Regime Legitimacy in Contemporary China: Institutional Change and Stability, London, New York (Routledge) 2008;
 (co-authored by Christian Göbel), The Politics of Community Building in Urban China, London, New York (Routledge) 2011 (paperback edition 2013);
(co-authored by Gunter Schubert), Weapons of the Rich. Strategic Action of Private Entrepreneurs in Contemporary China, Singapore, London, New York et al. (World Scientific) 2020.
Special Issue “Reappraisal of Political Representation across Political Orders: New Conceptual and Analytic Tools.” Guest editors: Thomas Heberer and Anna Shpakovskaya. In: Journal of Chinese Governance 4/2019.
 Disciplining of a Society. Social Disciplining and Civilizing Processes in Contemporary China. Cambridge/Mass. (Harvard University, Kennedy School, Ash Center) 2020. Online version: https://ash.harvard.edu/publications/disciplining-society-social-disciplining-and-civilizing-processes-contemporary

He also attaches great importance to publishing in Chinese and presenting his work to a wider audience in China.

On the occasion of his 70th birthday in 2017 the renowned Zhejiang University Press published a Chinese collection of Heberer's major research articles on China (托马斯∙海贝勒中国研究文选), edited by the political scientist Professor Yu Jianxing.

Among his book publications in Chinese are:

 作为战略群体的企业家. 中国私营企业家的社会与政治功能研究(Entrepreneurs as Strategic Groups. The social and political function of private entrepreneurs in China), Beijing (Zhongyang bianyi chubanshe) 2003.
 凉山彝族企业家. 社会与制度变迁的承载着 (Yi Entrepreneurs in Liangshan. Carriers of Social and Institutional Change), Beijing (Minzu chubanshe) 2005.
 从群众到公民. 中国的政治参与 (From Masses to Citizens. Political Participation in China), Beijing (Zhongyang bianyi chubanshe) 2009.
 (co-edited by Dieter Grunow and Li Huibin), 中国与德国的环境治理比较的视角 (Environmental Governance in China and Germany from a Comparative Perspective), Beijing (Zhongyang bianyi chubanshe) 2012.
 (co-edited by Gunter Schubert and Yang Xuedong), 主动的地方政治。作为战略群体的县乡干部 (Proactive Local Politics: County and Township cadres as Strategic Groups), Beijing (Zhongyang bianyi chubanshe), December 2013.
 (co-edited by Yu Keping and Björn Alpermann), 中共的治理与适应：比较的视野 (Governance and Adaption of the CCP: A Comparative Perspective), Beijing (Zhongyang bianyi chubanshe) 2015.
 东普鲁士与中国——追溯一段不解之缘 (Ostpreußen und China: Nachzeichnung einer wundersamen Beziehung, Chinese Edition), Wuhan: Wuhan University Press 2022.

Notes

External links 
The Official Website of Thomas Heberer
 On Heberer's life and work (in Chinese): Cong hongse chongjing dao tianye xianshi. Wang Hai (Thomas Heberer) yu Deguo Zhongguo yanjiu de zhuanxing [From red expectations to the reality of fieldwork. Wang Hai (Thomas Heberer) and the transformation of China research in Germany], Taipei 2010
 托马斯∙海贝勒中国研究文选 (Selection of Thomas Heberer's research in China Studies), Zhejiang University Press, Hangzhou 2017, with a biographical introduction.
 CV of Thomas Heberer
 List of publications

1947 births
Living people
Academic staff of the University of Duisburg-Essen
University of Bremen alumni